"Requiem for a Hit" is a song by French recording artist Miss Kittin featuring L.A. Williams. It is the second single from the Miss Kittin's first solo album I Com.  Co-written and co-produced by Thies Mynther, Tobias Neumann, it is composed as an electroclash and electropop song, that is a play on the line "I'll Beat that Bitch with a Bat." The song was later included on her 2005 EP Mixing Me.

Critical reception
XLR8R said, "From succulent rhymes to seductively sexual appeal, this girl knows well how to live on charts worldwide."

Les Inrockuptibles placed "Requiem for a Hit" at #38 on the Best Singles of 2004.

Live performances
Miss Kittin performed "Requiem for a Hit (2 Many DJ's Remix)" live at the Sónar festival and included it on her album Live at Sónar.

Track listing
 "Requiem For A Hit (Original Requiem)" - 5:12	
 "Requiem For A Hit (Ge-Gm Mix)"	- 6:12
 "Requiem For A Hit (Requiem For A Buzz)" - 6:00	
 "Requiem For A Hit (Abe Duque Remix)" - 6:29

Charts

References

2004 singles
Miss Kittin songs
Electroclash songs